Papali’i Tagaloatele Pasi Poloa (born ~1949) is a Samoan politician and Member of the Legislative Assembly of Samoa. He is a member of the FAST Party.

Tagaloatele is from Saleimoa and Aleisa and works as a sports administrator. In 2017 he was elected president of the Samoa Amateur Boxing Association  in a contested AGM, leading to a court case which overturned the results. In 2018 he was elected president of the Samoa Boxing Federation.

He ran for election in the 2021 Samoan general election in the seat of Sagaga No. 4, but was unsuccessful. He subsequently challenged the winning candidate, Tuisa Tasi Patea, in an election petition, forcing him to step down. He was elected to the legislative Assembly of Samoa in the resulting by-election, with a lead of over 400 votes on the preliminary count.

References

Living people
Members of the Legislative Assembly of Samoa
Faʻatuatua i le Atua Samoa ua Tasi politicians
People from Gaga'emauga
Year of birth missing (living people)